Marko Pomerants (born 24 September 1964) is an Estonian politician. He was the Minister of the Environment in 2015–2017. Previously, Pomerants has served as the Minister of Social Affairs from 2003 to 2005 and as the Minister of the Interior from 2009 to 2012. Pomerants is a member of the Pro Patria and Res Publica Union.

Early life
Marko Pomerants went to Tamsalu High School and completed higher education at the University of Tartu. He has degrees in geology and public administration.

Political career
Pomerants began his political career in the Lääne-Viru County Environmental Department in 1994. A year later he became the Governor of the county and served for eight years.

In 2003, he was a member of the 10th Riigikogu. On 10 April 2003, Pomerants was appointed Minister of Social Affairs, serving until 13 April 2005.

From 2007 to 2009, he was a member of the 11th Riigikogu.

From 2009 to 2011, Pomerants served as the Minister of the Interior.

In 2015 parliamentary elections, Pomerants was re-elected to the Riigikogu with 2,681 individual votes.

On 9 April 2015, he became the Minister of the Environment in Taavi Rõivas' second cabinet.

References

External links

1964 births
Living people
People from Tapa Parish
Isamaa politicians
Government ministers of Estonia
Environment ministers of Estonia
Members of the Riigikogu, 2003–2007
Members of the Riigikogu, 2007–2011
Members of the Riigikogu, 2011–2015
Members of the Riigikogu, 2015–2019
20th-century Estonian politicians
21st-century Estonian politicians
Ministers of the Interior of Estonia